Winnerbäck – Ett slags liv (Winnerbäck – A Kind of Life) is a 2017 documentary film about Swedish musician Lars Winnerbäck, directed by Øystein Karlsen, marking 20 years of the singer's career. It includes interviews with the subject and concert footage. To get around Winnerbäck's dislike of interviewers and cameras, his wife Agnes Kittelsen was given a camera to record some of the footage, Karlsen stating "I gave a camera to his wife, so that she could film him when he least expected it".

The film was premiered on 6 October 2017.

References

2017 animated films
2017 films
Swedish children's films
Swedish animated films
Films based on Swedish comics
Animated films based on comics
Swedish documentary films
2010s Swedish-language films
2010s Swedish films